Baryaza (Baryaźı) is a rural locality (a selo) in Kalmiyabashevsky Selsoviet, Kaltasinsky District, Bashkortostan, Russia. The population was 53 as of 2010. There is 1 street.

Geography 
Baryaza is located 25 km southeast of Kaltasy (the district's administrative centre) by road. Nadezhdino is the nearest rural locality.

References 

Rural localities in Kaltasinsky District